Obed Summit (el. ), is a highway summit in Alberta, Canada. It is the highest point on the Yellowhead Highway,  higher than Yellowhead Pass located on the Continental Divide of the Americas of the Canadian Rockies on the Alberta / British Columbia border. Obed Summit is located on Highway 16 near the hamlet of Obed, between Hinton and Edson.

References

Mountain passes of Alberta
Yellowhead County